I Got Life may refer to:

"I Got Life", song from Hair (Original London Cast Recording)
"I Got Life", song by Mercy Fall from For the Taken
I Got Life!, a 2017 French drama film (original title Aurore)